Oets Kolk Bouwsma (November 22, 1898 – March 1, 1978) was an American analytic philosopher.

Education and early career
Bouwsma was born of Dutch-American parents in Muskegon, Michigan. He was educated at Calvin College and at the University of Michigan.  In his early years he was an advocate of idealism, but later found the work of G. E. Moore's common sense counters to skepticism more appealing to his inclinations.  Nonetheless, he was critical of Moore.  He developed his own technique of analysis that focused on uncovering hidden analogies driving Moore's ways of speaking about sense data.  He worked intensely on Moore, publishing a significant paper, "Moore’s Theory of Sense-Data," which was eventually included in the Library of Living Philosophers volume on Moore.  The essay reflected the beginnings of a method of philosophical analysis that was soon to be forged by his reading of Ludwig Wittgenstein.

Later career
Engaged in Moore's philosophy, Bouwsma sent students from the University of Nebraska, most notably Morris Lazerowitz, to study with Moore at Cambridge.  Lazerowitz's wife Alice Ambrose, a student of Wittgenstein as well as Moore, introduced Bouwsma to Wittgenstein's revolutionary ideas in The Blue Book.  Norman Malcolm, another of Bouwsma's students, became a prominent interpreter and presenter of Wittgenstein's ideas in America, after studying with Wittgenstein at Cambridge.  Malcolm, who later taught at Cornell, was able to persuade Wittgenstein to visit there.  Simultaneously, Malcolm arranged for Bouwsma to teach at Cornell during Wittgenstein's visit.  By that time, in 1949, Bouwsma had absorbed the implications of Wittgenstein's philosophy in The Blue Book.  With a leave from the University of Nebraska and a Fulbright Fellowship, he was able to spend much of the next two years discussing philosophy with Wittgenstein at Cornell, Smith College, and Oxford.  Through Wittgenstein, Bouwsma developed an understanding of what he had been groping for in his work on Moore.

After the personal influence of Wittgenstein and much hard work on The Blue Book and Philosophical Investigations, Bouwsma emerged with a unique method of philosophical analysis that he applied to a variety of philosophical problems.   He continued to attack the skepticism of Descartes that reflected the idealism from which Bouwsma fought to free himself.  Applying Wittgenstein's radical turn of displaying the nonsense in place of refuting a philosophical theory, he turned to Berkeley's idealism where he teased the failure to make sense of ideas as entities in the mind out into the open.  With a focus on the opening question of The Blue Book on meaning, he wrote tirelessly on the idea of "meaning as use," until he shook himself loose of the notion that Wittgenstein was presenting another philosophical theory of meaning.  He came to understand and appropriate the idea that Wittgenstein had developed a set of techniques to arm the philosopher in the struggle against the “bewitchment of his intelligence by means of language.”  This understanding culminated in Bouwsma's accomplished article, The Blue Book, which described the aims of the new method of philosophical analysis.  With such perennial conceptually puzzling concepts as “time,” “truth,” and “thinking,” he carefully and often humorously compared sentences of philosophers with   actual sentences of daily life – earning Bouwsma a notable place in what came to be called “ordinary language philosophy.”  With this reputation, Gilbert Ryle asked Bouwsma to deliver the first of the famous John Locke Lectures at Oxford University.

With a lifelong attachment to the Christian Reformed Church, Bouwsma philosophically engaged the concepts of Christianity.  Applying his acquired techniques of philosophical analysis, he carefully distinguished the uses of the word “belief” in religious settings from uses in non-religious settings.  When called upon in philosophy to illuminate puzzling Christian concepts, he drew on his lifelong participation in the community of faith and on his reading of the Scriptures to dramatically bring to life their meaning.  In addition to Wittgenstein, his work on Kierkegaard was the other great influence in Bouwsma's philosophical development.  He came to understand the significance of Kierkegaard’s concept of “subjectivity” for thinking philosophically about Christianity.  On the one hand, “subjectivity” points to understanding the language of religion in the context of particular religious communities – an idea parallel to Wittgenstein's idea of understanding words and sentences in language-games and forms of life.  On the other hand, “subjectivity” makes clear that Christianity is an invitation to new life and not an objective system of metaphysics.  His papers in the philosophy of religion are collected separately in a volume with the title, Without Proof or Evidence, published by the University of Nebraska Press.

With a fine ear for expression, Bouwsma fastened on poetry, James Joyce’s Ulysses and Finnegans Wake, Shakespeare, Dickens, and novelists who artistically capture the expressions of ordinary language.  In this regard he reflected often on the writing and reading of literature.  He wrote and lectured on the “truth” of poetry, emphasizing its aesthetic value as opposed to its moral value.  He also wrote on the puzzling relationship of words to music in “The Expression Theory of Art.”  Extensive marginal notes filling his copies of Ulysses and Finnegans Wake indicate how consumed he was by Joyce's word play and how he appropriated a sensitivity to word play in his own writing style.

Bouwsma taught philosophy at the University of Nebraska from 1928 until 1965 and the University of Texas from 1965 until 1977.  His greatest influence came, not so much through his humorously and finely written essays, but through the many graduate students he trained in his unique style of exploring the borderlands of sense and nonsense in philosophical sentences.  Although he wrote incessantly and presented numerous papers, he published only one book toward the end of his career – a collection of essays titled Philosophical Essays.  He died in 1978 in Austin, Texas.  His papers and daily notebooks, the latter filling hundreds of legal pads, are housed in the Harry Ransom Humanities Research Center at The University of Texas, Austin.  J.L. Craft and Ronald E. Hustwit Sr. co-edited and published two additional volumes of his papers and selections of his commonplace book.  His notebooks recording his discussions with Wittgenstein, published with the title, Wittgenstein Conversations, 1949-51, have become a primary source for Wittgenstein studies.

Publications
 Philosophical Essays. University of Nebraska Press, 1965.

Posthumous Publications
(Collected and edited by J.L. Craft and R.E. Hustwit Sr.)
 Toward a New Sensibility: Essays of O.K. Bouwsma. University of Nebraska Press, 1982.
 Without Proof or Evidence: Essays of O.K. Bouwsma. University of Nebraska Press, 1984.
 Wittgenstein Conversations, 1949-1951. Hackett Publishing, 1986.
 The Flux: O.K. Bouwsma’s John Locke Lectures at Oxford University, 1951. The College of Wooster, Wooster, Ohio, 1990.
 Bouwsma’s Notes on Wittgenstein’s Philosophy, 1965-1975. Edwin Mellen Press, 1995.
 O.K. Bouwsma’s Commonplace Book – Remarks on Philosophy and Education. Edwin Mellen Press, 1999.

See also
American philosophy
List of American philosophers

References

Further reading
 Remembering O.K. Bouwsma: An Interview with Charles and Gretchen Emmons Bouwsma. C& C Video Productions, 2002. Produced by R.E. Hustwit Sr.
 An Annotated Bibliography of O.K. Bouwsma’s Published Writings. 2005. Assembled and annotated by R.E. Hustwit Sr.
 Something About O.K. Bouwsma. The University Press of America, 1991. By R.E. Hustwit Sr.
 "O.K. Bouwsma." R.E. Hustwit. The Cambridge Dictionary of Philosophy. Ed. By Robert Audi. Cambridge University Press, 1995.

External links
Philosophy Department web page of Ronald E. Hustwit Sr

1898 births
1978 deaths
American male essayists
American people of Dutch descent
20th-century American philosophers
American philosophy academics
Analytic philosophers
Calvin University alumni
Christian philosophers
Epistemologists
Metaphysicians
Ontologists
Ordinary language philosophy
Philosophers of education
Philosophers of language
Philosophers of mind
Philosophers of religion
University of Michigan alumni
Wittgensteinian philosophers